Joseph Huntley (1775–1857) was a 19th-century biscuit maker and innovator, who lived in the English town of Reading. In 1822 he founded a small biscuit baker and confectioner shop at number 72 London Street.

Business
At this time, London Street was the main stage coach route from London to Bristol, Bath and the West Country. One of the main calling points of the stage coaches was the Crown Inn, opposite Joseph Huntley's shop and he started selling his biscuits to the travellers on the coaches.  Because the biscuits were vulnerable to breakage on the coach journey, he started putting them in a metal tin. Out of this innovation grew two businesses: Joseph (the elder's) biscuit shop that was to become the famous biscuit manufacturer Huntley & Palmers, and Huntley, Bourne and Stevens, a firm of biscuit tin manufacturers founded by his younger son, also called Joseph. In 1838, Joseph Huntley was forced by ill-health to retire, handing control of the shop to his older son Thomas Huntley, who was joined in partnership by George Palmer.

References
 Reading History Trail, Huntley and Palmers, Retrieved 10 October 2005

j
1775 births
1857 deaths
People from Reading, Berkshire
People in food and agriculture occupations
English businesspeople